The first season of the Australian competitive cooking competition show My Kitchen Rules premiered on the Seven Network on 1 February 2010.

Teams

Elimination history

Competition details

Instant Restaurants
During the Instant Restaurant rounds, each team hosts a three-course dinner for judges and fellow teams in their allocated group. They are scored and ranked among their group, with the lowest scoring team being eliminated.

Round 1
 Episodes 1 to 5
 Airdate – 1 to 15 February
 Description – The first of the two instant restaurant groups are introduced into the competition in Round 1. The lowest scoring team at the end of this round is eliminated.

Round 2
 Episodes 6 to 10
 Airdate – 16 February to 2 March
 Description – The second group now start their Instant Restaurant round. The same rules from the previous round apply and the lowest scoring team is eliminated.

Kitchen Cook-Off
 Episode 11
 Airdate – 8 March
 Description –  The 3rd and 4th ranked teams from each instant restaurant round competed against one another in a Kitchen Cook-Off, cooking a signature dish. Pete and Manu scored each dish, and the two lowest scoring teams were eliminated.

Quarter-finals

Round 1
 Episode 12
 Airdate – 9 March
 Description – Matthew & Gabe and Holly & Grace competed against each other in the first Quarter Final. The lower scoring team is eliminated and the winning team advances through to the Semi-Finals.

Round 2
 Episode 13
 Airdate – 15 March
 Description – Clint & Noah and Paul & Mel competed against each other in the second Quarter Final, with the lower scoring team being eliminated. As Clint & Noah received the highest score overall, they proceeded straight through to the Grand Final.

Round 3
 Episode 14
 Airdate – 16 March
 Description – Veronica & Shadi and Tanja & Gen competed against each other in the third Quarter Final. The lower scoring team is eliminated and the winning team advances through to the Semi-Finals.

Semi-final
 Episode 14
 Airdate – 16 March
 Description – Veronica & Shadi and Matthew & Gabe competed against each other, cooking a signature dish worthy of the last spot in the Grand Final. The winner proceeds through to the Grand Final and the lower scoring team is eliminated.

Grand Final
 Episode 15
 Airdate – 22 March
 Description – The top two teams face off in the Grand Final. Each team cooks a three course meal served to eliminated teams, friends and family. The guest judges return for the final verdict of awarding the $100,000 prize to the winners. The teams also wear proper chef attire and have their Instant Restaurant represented.

Ratings
 Colour Key:
  – Highest Rating
  – Lowest Rating
  – Elimination Episode
  – Finals Week

References

External links
Official site

2010 Australian television seasons
My Kitchen Rules